Museum of Archaeology and Anthropology may refer to a number of museums, including:

Museo Nacional de Antropología, Mexico City, Mexico
Museo Nacional de Arqueología, Antropología e Historia del Perú, Lima, Peru
Museum of Archaeology and Anthropology, University of Cambridge, England
University of Pennsylvania Museum of Archaeology and Anthropology, Philadelphia, United States

See also 
 National Museum of Anthropology (disambiguation)